Frost on Sunday may refer to:

 Frost on Sunday (1968–1970), one of a trio of talk shows for LWT that aired from August 1968 to March 1970
 David Frost on Sunday, a political programme that aired from September 1986 until December 1992. 
 Breakfast with Frost, a political programme that aired from 1993 to 2005